Yerkebulan Sabyruly Nurgaliyev (born 12 September 1993) is a Kazakhstani footballer who plays as a midfielder for Aktobe.

Career

Club
In January 2018, Nurgaliyev signed for Akzhayik.

On 6 December 2018, Nurgaliyev signed a one-year contract with Shakhter Karagandy.

References

External links
 

1993 births
Living people
Kazakhstani footballers
Kazakhstani expatriate footballers
Expatriate footballers in Bulgaria
Kazakhstan Premier League players
First Professional Football League (Bulgaria) players
FC Irtysh Pavlodar players
FC Okzhetpes players
FC Vereya players
FC Akzhayik players
FC Shakhter Karagandy players
FC Caspiy players
FC Aktobe players
Association football midfielders
Sportspeople from Semey